Henry Colin Campbell (died April 18, 1930), aka The Torch Murderer, was executed by the State of New Jersey for the murder of Mildred Mowry, whom he met through a personal ad placed with a "matrimonial agency." A career criminal and bigamist whose previous crimes were non-violent, Campbell married Mowry in 1929 despite having another wife. Six months after marrying Mowry, Campbell murdered her to collect on a $1,000 investment she owned and burned her corpse.

He was also suspected in another, similar murder of Margaret Brown in 1928. Both Mowry and Brown had been shot in the head, had their bodies dumped on the side of a road, and were set on fire.

During his adult life, Campbell worked as a civil engineer and advertising executive and posed as a physician. Using a matchmaking service in Detroit, Michigan, Campbell married several women between 1910 and 1928 although police looking into his life were never able to find any record of divorce actions.

A pair of shoes at the Mowry crime scene were traced to Campbell who subsequently confessed to killing her. He denied killing Brown and never stood trial for her murder. Police suspected he murdered some of his previous "wives".

See also
 Capital punishment in New Jersey
 Capital punishment in the United States
 List of people executed in New Jersey

References

1930 deaths
20th-century executions by New Jersey
20th-century executions of American people
American people executed for murder
People convicted of murder by New Jersey
People executed by New Jersey by electric chair
Suspected serial killers
Uxoricides
Year of birth missing